Mijan (also Romanized as Mījān) is a village in Deh Kahan Rural District, Aseminun District, Manujan County, Kerman Province, Iran. At the 2021 census, its population was 6, in 6 families.

References 

Populated places in Manujan County